The Black Mountains of northwest Arizona are an extensive, mostly linear, north-south trending  long mountain range. It forms the north-south border of southwest Mohave County as it borders the eastern shore of the south-flowing Colorado River from Hoover Dam.

The northwest and part of the western areas of the range are located within the Lake Mead National Recreation Area. Three wilderness areas are within the range. The historic mining site of Oatman, 4 miles north of Boundary Cone, is nestled in the southern portion of the range between the Mount Nutt and Warm Springs wildernesses.

Geography
The mountain range is generally 10-15 mi wide, narrower in the north, and west of the Detrital Valley northeast. The southern end of the range with the two wilderness areas is a larger block and the Warm Springs Wilderness is made of a mountain section called Black Mesa, separated from the north section by Sitgreaves Pass, on the route to Oatman, Arizona.

The Cerbat Mountains border eastwards.

Watersheds
The Black Mountains are in four watersheds. The north and northeast contain the Lake Mead Watershed, and the north-flowing Detrital Wash Watershed. The west along the Colorado River and southern-west contains the Havasu-Mohave Lakes Watershed where the Sacramento Wash Watershed flows into the southern Topock Marsh, at the southern third of the Havasu-Mohave Lakes region.

See also
 Boundary Cone
 Fortification Hill

References

External links

 Mount Perkins, mountainzone.com, coord
 Mount Perkins, trails.com

Watersheds
 Detrital Wash Watershed
 Havasu-Mohave Lakes Watershed
 Sacramento Wash Watershed, in Sacramento Valley

Lake Mead National Recreation Area
Mountain ranges of Mohave County, Arizona
Mountain ranges of the Lower Colorado River Valley
Mountain ranges of the Mojave Desert
Mountain ranges of Arizona